Ancylosis albidella is a species of snout moth in the genus Ancylosis. It was described by Émile Louis Ragonot, in 1888 and is known from Uzbekistan, Spain, Portugal, Hungary and Slovakia.

References

Moths described in 1888
albidella
Moths of Europe
Moths of Asia